Events in the year 1176 in Norway.

Incumbents
Monarch: Magnus V Erlingsson

Events
Eystein Meyla is proclaimed king at Øreting.

Arts and literature

Births

Deaths

References

Norway